Herman is a 1990 Norwegian drama film directed by Erik Gustavson. The film was selected as the Norwegian entry for the Best Foreign Language Film at the 63rd Academy Awards, but was not accepted as a nominee.

Cast
 Anders Danielsen Lie as Herman
 Frank Robert as Grandfather
 Elisabeth Sand as Mother
 Kai Remlov as Jacobsen Jr.
 Sossen Krohg as Fru Jacobsen
 Harald Heide-Steen Jr. as Tjukken
 Bjørn Floberg as Father
 Jarl Kulle as Panten

See also
 List of submissions to the 63rd Academy Awards for Best Foreign Language Film
 List of Norwegian submissions for the Academy Award for Best Foreign Language Film

References

External links
 

1990 films
1990 drama films
Norwegian drama films
1990s Norwegian-language films